Jandhyala (Telugu: జంధ్యాల) is an Indian surname.

People with the surname include:

 Jandhyala (1951–2001), Telugu writer and film director
 Jandhyala Papayya Sastry (1912–1992), veteran Telugu poet

Indian surnames